Sherif, also spelled Sharif (and, in countries where Francophone Romanisation is the norm, Cherif or Charif), is a proper name derived from the Arabic word  ('noble', 'highborn', 'honorable'), originally a title designating a person descended from the family of the Islamic prophet Muhammad. More broadly, the title  was historically applied to anyone of noble ancestry or political preeminence in Islamic countries.

The name has no etymological connection with the English term sheriff, which comes from the Old English word scīrgerefa, meaning "shire-reeve", the local reeve (enforcement agent) of the king in the shire (county).

Given name
Sherif Abdel-Fadil (born 1983), Egyptian footballer
Sherif Ahmeti (1920 – 1998), commentator and translator of the Quran into Albanian
Sherif Alaa, Egyptian footballer
Sherif Arafa (born 1960), Egyptian director, writer and producer
Sherif Ashraf (born 1987), Egyptian footballer
Sherif Boubaghla (1820 – 1854), Algerian military resistance leader who led a struggle against the French colonial invasion
Sherif Dabo (born 1994), Egyptian footballer
Sherif Desoky (born 1967), Egyptian actor, director, author, and storyteller
Sherif Ekramy (born 1983), Egyptian goalkeeper
Sherif El Bendary (born 1978), Egyptian film director, writer and producer
Sherif El-Digwy (born 1965), Egyptian judoka. 
Sherif El-Erian (born 1970), Egyptian modern pentathlete
Sherif El-Khashab (born 1961), Egyptian football manager
Sherif El-Masri (born 1990), Canadian footballer
Sherif El-Saket (born 1970), Egyptian table tennis player.
Sherif El Shemerly, Egyptian volleyball coach
Sherif Farrag, Egyptian-American fencer
Sherif Fawaz Sharaf (born 1938), retired Jordanian administrator and ambassador
Sherif Fawzy (born 1990), Egyptian footballer
Sherif Fouad Aboulkheir (1947–2021), Egyptian basketball player
Sherif Gaber (born c. 1993), Egyptian political activist and blogger who was arrested for atheist activism
Sherif Genedy (born 1979), Egyptian basketball player
Sherif Ismail (1955–2023), Egyptian engineer who served as Prime Minister of Egypt between 2015 and 2018
Sherif Jimoh (born 1996), Ivorian footballer 
Sherif Kallaku (born 1998), Albanian footballer
Sherif Khalil (born 1982), Egyptian water polo player
Sherif Langu (1877 - 1956), Albanian politician and one of the founding fathers of Albania
Sherif Medhat (born 1988), Egyptian footballer
Sherif Mohie El Din (born 1964), Egyptian conductor and composer
Sherif Moemen (born 1974), Egyptian handball player
Sherif Mounir (born 1959), Egyptian actor
Sherif Othman (born 1982), Egyptian Paralympic powerlifter
Sherif Sabri Pasha (born 1895), Egyptian politician
Sherif Sabry (born 1986), Egyptian tennis player
Sherif Sadiku (born 1998), Albanian footballer 
Sherif Salama (born 1979), Egyptian actor
Sherif Saleh (born 1954), Egyptian sports shooter
Sherif Sonbol (born 1956), Egyptian photographer
Sherif Touré Coubageat (born 1983), former Togolese footballer

Surname
Abdusalam Al-Sherif (born 1989), Saudi footballer
Ahmed Sherif (born 2003), Egyptian footballer 
Ali Pasha Sherif (1834 – 1897), Egyptian government official and breeder of Arabian horses
Amro Sherif (born 1991), Egyptian basketball player
Basem Al-Sherif (born 1984), Saudi footballer
Carolyn Sherif (1922 – 1982), American social psychologist, helped to develop social judgment theory
Feroz Sherif (born 1971), former Indian footballer and coach
Hassan Sherif (born 1952), Ethiopian boxer
Hoza'a Sherif (c. 1961 – 2015), Lebanese diplomat 
Hussein Sherif, Egyptian taekwondo practitioner
Ihab el-Sherif (1954 – 2005), Egyptian ambassador to Iraq, killed by Iraqi kidnappers in July 2005
K. S. G. Haja Shareef, Indian politician
Lamine Kaba Sherif (born 1999), Guinean footballer 
Mayar Sherif (born 1996), Egyptian women's tennis player
Mohammed Ismail Sherif (born 2002), known as Black Sherif, Ghanaian musician and performer
Mohamed Saad El Din Sherif (died 1997), Egyptian general and Chairman of the Arab Scout Parliamentary Union
Mohamed Sherif (disambiguation), several people
Mohamed Sherif Mohamed Ragaei Bakr (born 1996), Egyptian footballer
Muzafer Sherif (1906 – 1988), Turkish-American psychologist, one of the founders of social psychology
Nahed Sherif (1942 – 1981), Egyptian actress
Nour El-Sherif (1946 – 2015), Egyptian actor
Rana Sherif Ahmed (born 1994), Egyptian tennis player
Safwat El-Sherif (1933 – 2021), Egyptian politician
Seif Asser Sherif (born 1995), Egyptian trampolinist
Sultan Al-Sherif (born 1991), Saudi footballer 
Uche Sherif (born 1983), Nigerian footballer
Vamba Sherif (born 1973), Liberian-born writer
Youssef El Sherif (born 1978), Egyptian actor

See also
Muhammed Sharif (disambiguation), a list of people specifically called Muhammed Sharif, Mohamed Sherif, etc.
Şerif, the name Sherif in Turkish
Shareef (given name)
Shareef (surname)

References